Eve is Thalia Zedek's sixth solo album, released three years after Via.

Background

Released by Thrill Jockey on August 19, 2016, three years after her previous solo album Via, Eve was recorded in the Fall of 2015 at Kimchee Studios, in Cambridge, MA. Zedek's third solo album to be credited to the Thalia Zedek Band, Eve was engineered and mixed by Andy Hong, while Andy Guthrie recorded the percussion on three songs, namely, "Afloat," “You Will Wake," and "Northwest Branch." Eve was mastered by Heba Kadry at Timeless Mastering in November 2015.

The process of writing the songs for Eve was different from that of Zedek's previous records, as the band "recorded a fair amount of songs that [they] hadn’t played live before [they] recorded them." She reflected that "[w]hen you’re writing in the studio, it lends a different, more reflective feel to the music."

Zedek has characterised Eve as "darker than [her] last few albums," listing globalisation, economic instability, the internet, and global warming as some of the reasons why her songwriting has taken an even more sombre turn. The title of the album refers to the anxiety regarding being at the brink of change. As Zedek puts it, "I feel like we are on the eve of something momentous. It may be the eve of a new era, or the eve of destruction, I don’t know."

Eve was Zedek's first album to feature Jonathan Ulman—who also contributed to her 2014 EP Six—on drums.

Hilken Mancini (Fuzzy, Shepherdess) contributed back-up vocals for "Afloat," the album's opening song.

Track listing 

All songs and lyrics by Thalia Zedek.

Personnel 

Thalia Zedek Band

 Thalia Zedek – vocals, acoustic guitars, electric guitars 
 David Michael Curry – viola 
 Mel Lederman – piano
 Jonathan Ulman – drums, percussion
 Winston Braman – bass

Additional musicians

 Hilken Mancini – back-up vocals on "Afloat”

Additional personnel

 Andy Hong – engineering and mixing 
 Andy Guthrie – recording of percussion on "Afloat," “You Will Wake," and "Northwest Branch" 
 Heba Kadry – mastering  
 Dan Zedek – design 
 Krisa – front and inside cover photos

Critical reception

On Metacritic, the album has a weighted average score of 81 out of 100, based on 10 critics, indicating "universal acclaim." In his review for The Quietus, Neil Kulkarni stated that Eve includes "some of the best songs [Zedek has] ever written," going on to claim that she always manages "to map out a territory in songwriting that's almost entirely her own." In his four-star review of the album for Blurt, John Schacht describes the material in Eve as "extended, slow-burn songs […] that evolve from quiet viola and/or piano-accented meditations into emotionally cathartic maelstroms built mostly around [Zedek’s] biting guitar." Ludovic Hunter-Tinley, in his praising, four-star review of Eve for The Financial Times, called it "a tribute to uncompromising artistic survival." In his review for The Skinny, Gary Kaill called Eve "a collection of upfront confessionals that fuses guitar, bass and drums into a hellfire brew," going on to laud Zedek, stating that "there are few artists whose commitment to performance is so absolute and fearless."

References

External links 
 Allmusic Review

Thalia Zedek albums
Blues rock albums by American artists
2016 albums